Active power filters (APF) are filters, which can perform the job of harmonic elimination. Active power filters can be used to filter out harmonics in the power system which are significantly below the switching frequency of the filter. The active power filters are used to filter out both higher and lower order harmonics in the power system.

The main difference between active power filters and passive power filters is that APFs mitigate harmonics by injecting active power with the same frequency but with reverse phase to cancel that harmonic, where passive power filters use combinations of resistors (R), inductors (L) and capacitors (C) and does not require an external power source or active components such as transistors. This difference, make it possible for APFs to mitigate a wide range of harmonics.

See also
Static synchronous series compensator
Power conditioner
Active filter
Line filter

References

Filters
Power engineering